Dribbleware, in the context of computer software, is a product for which patches are often being released. The term usually has negative connotations, and can refer to software which hasn't been tested properly prior to release, or for which planned features could not be implemented.

Dribbleware is not necessarily due to poor programming; it can be indicative of a product whose development was rushed to meet a release date.

References

Software industry